The World Talent Exchange and Sharing Organization (abbreviated to World TESO, WTESO, TESO) is a specialized international organization  for promoting professional talent development and sharing between affirmed national leveled representative organizations and other talent.

History of the World TESO

 In 2013, the national talent organizations including Korea Federation of Talent and Philippine Federation of Talent collectively formed and joined to the World Talent Exchange and Sharing Organization 
 In 2014, the World TESO authorized the Preparation Group of Australian Federation of Talent under the World TESO
 In 2015, the Executive Council of the World TESO arranged the Model Professional Individual Membership for affirmed national organizations
 On March 28, 2015, the World TESO Chairperson Seung Chan Kim and Executive Council collectively announced their patents (US Patent Provisional Application #62139649) about Zaire Ebola RefSeq Genome to public, because the World TESO global research team believes eliminating Ebola Virus is crucial for the World 
 On May 13, 2015, Chairperson of the Korea Federation of Talent ( 대한민국인재연합회 ) arranged a MOU with the Vietnam leading charity Association for the Support of Thanh Hoa Handicapped and Orphans for that Federation and World TESO. After then, the World TESO authorized the Preparation Group of Vietnam Organization of Talent within the World TESO.

Main business

Sharing Talent, Talent Development and Creative Education through the World"
Other Business for Global Talent Development

Membership
All Regular Members shall have equal rights and obligations in the Organization. While a nation is represented in the World TESO by one national leveled organization, any number of organizations from the same nation or state may be accepted as Associate Members. Associate Members has the same rights and obligation as Regular Members except for voting rights.

Any decision on membership shall be made by majority of the Executive Council councilors and approved by majority of the Conference.

See also
 Talent Medal of Korea
 United Nations
 NGO

References

International organizations based in South Korea
International educational organizations
Organizations established in 2013
2013 establishments in South Korea
Organizations based in Seoul